Provincial Trunk Highway 77 (PTH 77) is a provincial highway in the Canadian province of Manitoba. It runs from the Saskatchewan boundary (where it meets Highway 3) near Westgate to PTH 10 near Baden. It was designated in 1987, replacing PR 277.

077